The American Journal of Occupational Therapy is a bimonthly peer-reviewed medical journal that is published by the American Occupational Therapy Association. It covers research practice and health care issues in the field of occupational therapy.

Abstracting and indexing
The journal is abstracted and indexed in Index Medicus/MEDLINE/PubMed, CINAHL, PsycINFO, Social Sciences Citation Index, and Current Contents/Social & Behavioral Sciences. According to the Journal Citation Reports, the journal has a 2019 2-year impact factor of 2.246 and a 5-year impact factor of 3.776.

Past Editors-In-Chief

References

External links

American Journal of Occupational Therapy at American Occupational Therapy Association website

Bimonthly journals
English-language journals
Publications established in 1947
Academic journals published by learned and professional societies of the United States
Occupational therapy journals